Paul John Knowles (April 14, 1946 – December 18, 1974), also known as The Casanova Killer, was an American serial killer tied to the deaths of 18 people in 1974, though he claimed to have murdered 35.

Early life
Born in Orlando, Florida, Knowles lived in foster homes before first being incarcerated at the age of 19. In early 1974, Knowles was serving time at Raiford Prison in Florida (now known as Florida State Prison) when he began corresponding with a divorcee in San Francisco, eventually becoming engaged. His fiancée paid for his legal counsel and, upon his release, Knowles flew directly to California to be with her, but she called off the wedding. Knowles claimed to have murdered three people on the streets of San Francisco that night, but that has never been verified.

Knowles returned to Jacksonville, Florida. He was soon arrested after stabbing a bartender during a fight, but he picked a lock in his detention cell and escaped on July 26, 1974.

Crime spree

After his escape from police custody, Knowles began a four-month, multistate crime spree. At the time, the crimes were not linked but after Knowles' capture authorities discovered he had recorded audiotaped confessions that he mailed to an attorney. These tapes were never released to the public, but were reviewed by a grand jury in 1975. The tapes, along with all transcripts, were destroyed "after being ruined beyond repair in a flood of the Federal Courthouse in Macon," according to the Georgia Bureau of Investigation.

On the night of his escape from police custody, Knowles broke into the home of 65-year-old Alice Curtis and gagged her, ransacked her home for money and valuables, then stole her car. Curtis choked to death due to being gagged.

In his taped confessions, Knowles claimed to have murdered a teenage girl named "Alma." On December 21, 2011, the Georgia Bureau of Investigation identified this victim as 13-year-old Ima Jean Sanders, who disappeared on August 1, 1974 in Warner Robins, Georgia, and whose skeletal remains were found in April 1976.

Knowles claimed to have kidnapped and killed 11-year-old Lillian and 7-year-old Mylette Anderson outside of Jacksonville, Florida, on Aug. 1, 1974. Although the girls' disappearance was never solved, investigators have said they believe this was a false confession 

On August 2, 1974, Knowles met Marjorie Howie, 49, in Atlantic Beach, Florida. She was found strangled in her apartment and her television set was stolen. 
 
On August 23, 1974, Knowles forced his way into the home of Kathie Sue Pierce in Musella, Georgia. Knowles strangled Pierce, but left her three-year-old son physically unharmed.

On September 3, 1974, 32-year-old William Bates was seen with a redheaded man at Scott's Inn, a roadside pub near Lima, Ohio. Bates' wife reported him missing. Near the bar, police found Alice Curtis's vehicle abandoned but Bates' car was missing. In October, Bates' nude body was found. He had been strangled and dumped in the woods.

Now driving Bates' car, Knowles bound and killed two elderly campers, Emmett and Lois Johnson, at a rest stop near Ely, Nevada on September 18, 1974.

Charlynn Hicks was reported missing by family on Sept. 22, 1974. Her body was found discarded beside the road on Sept. 25, 1975, near a rest stop outside of Seguin, Texas. Her vehicle was found at the rest stop. She had been raped and strangled.

Knowles appears to have met beautician Ann Dawson on September 23, 1974, in Birmingham, Alabama. It is unclear as to whether he abducted her or if she traveled with him willingly, but she paid the bills while they traveled together. Knowles claimed that he killed Dawson on September 29, 1974, and threw her body into the Mississippi River. Her body was never recovered.

On Oct. 16, 1974, Karen Wine and her 16-year-old daughter Dawn were bound, raped and strangled after their Marlborough, Connecticut, home was broken into. The only thing found missing from their home was a tape recorder. Authorities say that Knowles was the perpetrator.

On October 18, 1974, 53-year-old Doris Hosey was shot to death with her husband's rifle. The gun was placed beside her body.

Knowles picked up two hitchhikers in Key West, Florida and was stopped by a policeman. Knowles was driving a car stolen from victim William Bates, but the officer let Knowles go with a warning. Shaken by the experience, Knowles dropped off the hitchhikers in Miami, Florida without harming them. 

Around this time, Knowles recorded audiotaped confessions to crimes, mailing them to a lawyer in Florida.

On November 2, Edward Hillard and Debbie Griffin disappeared while hitchhiking near Macon. Hillard's body was found in nearby woods, while Griffin was never found. Knowles is reportedly suspected in their murders.

On November 6, 1974, in Milledgeville, Georgia, Knowles befriended Carswell Carr and was invited back to Carr's house to spend the night. He stabbed Carr to death and strangled Carr's 15-year-old daughter, Amanda.

On November 8, Knowles met British journalist Sandy Fawkes in Atlanta. Fawkes said that he impressed her with his looks which were a "cross between Robert Redford and Ryan O'Neal."
The pair spent the next few days together, but Fawkes said Knowles was unable to perform when they attempted to have sex. They parted ways on November 10. The next day, Knowles picked up an acquaintance of Fawkes, Susan Mackenzie, and demanded sex from her at gunpoint. She escaped and notified the police. When patrolmen tried to apprehend him, Knowles brandished a sawed-off shotgun and made his escape.

Days later, in West Palm Beach, Florida, he invaded the home of invalid Beverly Mabee, where he abducted her sister, Barbara Mabee Abel, and stole their car. From there, he traveled to Fort Pierce, Florida, arriving the following night. As Barbara later publicized in her book ONE SURVIVOR, she was raped during the captivity she suffered, before Knowles released her.

Capture
On the morning of November 16, Florida Highway Patrol Trooper Charles Eugene Campbell (35) recognized the stolen car near Perry, Florida. Knowles was able to wrestle the officer's pistol away from him and, taking Campbell hostage, drove away in the patrol car. Knowles used the police siren to stop a 29-year-old motorist named James Meyer, putting both hostages in Meyer's car.

Knowles took the two men into a wooded area in Pulaski County, Georgia and handcuffed them to a tree before shooting each of them in the head at close range. Shortly thereafter, Knowles crashed the car through a police roadblock in Henry County, Georgia, escaping the vehicle on foot and firing shots at the pursuing officers. Knowles was shot in the foot by Chief Detective Philip S. Howard during his escape and Officer Jerry Key was injured when Knowles' stolen car crashed into his patrol car. A chaotic footrace ensued, with Knowles pursued by dogs, law enforcement officers from several agencies, and helicopters.

Knowles was cornered on November 17 by 27-year-old Vietnam War Veteran and hospital maintenance worker David Clark, a civilian armed with a shotgun. Henry County investigators Paul Robbins and Billy Payne arrived on the scene, arresting and handcuffing Knowles. Knowles was outside of the perimeter established for the manhunt and would have escaped if not for the actions of the local citizens.

Death 
On December 18, 1974, Sheriff Earl Lee and Agent Ronnie Angel from the Georgia Bureau of Investigation were traveling down Interstate 20 with Knowles, who was handcuffed in the back seat.  Their destination was Henry County, Georgia, where Knowles had, per a Georgia GBI press release, admitted to dumping a handgun he had taken from Florida State Trooper Charles Eugene Campbell, after killing him with it.

The GBI reported, "Knowles grabbed Lee's handgun, discharging it through the holster in the process and while Lee was struggling with Knowles and attempting to keep control of the vehicle, Angel fired three shots into Knowles' chest, killing him instantly".

See also 
 List of serial killers in the United States
 List of serial killers by number of victims

References

Bibliography 
 Sandy Fawkes, Killing Time, 1977, Taplinger Publishing Co, London
 Sandy Fawkes, Natural Born Killer: In Love and on the Road with a Serial Killer, 2004, John Blake Publishing, London
 Georgina Lloyd, One was not enough, 1976, London

External links
Trooper Campbell's page at the Officer Down Memorial Page
Gravesite

1946 births
1974 deaths
American murderers of children
American rapists
American serial killers
American spree killers
Deaths by firearm in Florida
Male serial killers
People from Orlando, Florida
People shot dead by law enforcement officers in the United States